Chatikona is a small village of Rayagada district in the state of Odisha, India. It is one of the identified Tourist Centres (scenic spot) of Odisha.

Introduction
The village is surrounded by the famous Niyamgiri hills in its three directions.  Every year, on the festival of Maha Shivaratri, people from all nook and corner of Odisha come to visit this place as there is a beautiful Shiva (Lord Pataleswar) temple at Chatikona. Beside the temple of Lord Shiva, Chatikona Falls enhance the  scenic beauty of the place. Numerous waterfalls and streams flow from the hills of Niyamgiri. Bissam Cuttack railway station is, in fact, situated at Chatikona village  and hence the village is well connected with railways.

Geography
Chatikona is situated about 48 km from the district headquarters i.e. Rayagada. Chatikona is situated at lat.19° 28′N and lon. 83° 27′E. The nearest villages are Kurli, Khambesi, Kiyapadu and Khajuri.

Demography
Majority of the population at and nearby Chatikona are primitive tribal known as Dongaria kondha. As per census 2011 available in the "Official website of census india"  the population of Chatikona is 2183 out of which male population is 1067 and female population is 1116.

Educational institutions
Maa Markama college, Bissamcuttack is the nearest college to Chatikona.  Besides, the following educational institutions are situated at Chatikona. 
The Niyamgiri High School
Govt. M.E.School
Govt. U.P.School
Railway U.P.School
Ambedkar English Medium U.P.
Nalini Vidya Mandira (Residential school) at Bariguda
D.K.D.A. Ashrama School
Saraswati Sishu Mandir

Tourist attraction

The temple of Lord Shiva (Pataleswar) with a beautiful water fall beside, is a  picnic spot and a place of tourist attraction   of Rayagada district. Besides, there is a tribal museum of Dongaria Kondha culture organized by D.K.D.A.CHATIKONA.
An Oriya film namely "Jianta Bhoota" produced in the year 2011 by Akhaya Kumar parija and directed by Prasanta Nanda which is based on the lives of Dongaria Kondha of this area won National Film Awards under National Film Award for Best Non-Feature Environment/Conservation/Preservation Film category.

Other tourist attractions around the place is the Maa Markama Temple, Laxminarayana Temple at Therubali and the Shiva temple at Paikapada, Rayagada. The weekly Wednesday market at Chatikona is also worth seeing. Here highly ornamented Dongaria Kondha and Desia Kondha villages of Niyamagiri area bring their produce to sell.

See also
 List of waterfalls in India (Odisha)

References

External links
 Official website of Rayagada district
  "Tourist places of Rayagada district:Atithi.org"

Cities and towns in Rayagada district
Villages in Rayagada district
Hindu temples in Rayagada district